Lawrence William Levine (February 27, 1933 – October 23, 2006) was an American historian. He was born in Manhattan and died in Berkeley, California. He was noted for promoting multiculturalism and the perspectives of ordinary people in the study of history.

Life
He graduated from the City College of New York in 1955, and from Columbia University, with a master's degree and a doctorate in 1962, where he studied under Richard Hofstadter. He taught at Princeton University from 1962 to 1963, and then at the University of California, Berkeley, from 1963 to 1994. After retiring from Berkeley, he taught at George Mason University from 1994 to 2005.

He participated in civil rights sit-ins at Berkeley and in the South, and the Free Speech Movement.

He married Cornelia Roettcher Levine in 1964, with whom he wrote The People and the President: America's Conversation with FDR; they had two sons, Joshua Levine and Isaac Levine, and a stepson, Alexander Pimentel.

Awards and honors
Levine was a MacArthur Fellow in 1983, elected to the American Academy of Arts and Sciences in 1985 and a Fulbright Scholar in History from the University of California - Berkeley to the University of Sydney in 1988. He was president of the Organization of American Historians in 1992–93 and received a Guggenheim Fellowship in 1994. An award in his name is given by the Organization of American Historians.

Works
    (reprint Harvard University Press, 1987)

References

External links
"A Conversation with Lawrence Levine: The University Is Not the U.S. Army", NEH, 1997

City College of New York alumni
University of California, Berkeley College of Letters and Science faculty
Columbia University alumni
George Mason University faculty
1933 births
2006 deaths
MacArthur Fellows
20th-century American historians
American male non-fiction writers
Historians from California
20th-century American male writers